The Socialist Party of the Manzanillo was a political party in Manzanillo, Cuba, formed in 1906. Agustín Martín Vélez, a tobacco worker and former anarchist, was the leader of the party. The party was Marxist in its orientation and was active in leading the Federación Obrera de Manzanillo trade union movement. Some of the leaders of the party later became active in the Communist Party of Cuba.

References

Defunct political parties in Cuba
Socialist parties in Cuba
Political parties established in 1906
1906 establishments in Cuba
Marxist parties